Harry "Big Greenie" Greenberg (1909November 22, 1939)  was an associate and childhood friend of Benjamin "Bugsy" Siegel, and an employee of both Charlie "Lucky" Luciano and Meyer Lansky.

Early years
He was born in Brooklyn, New York in 1909. Greenberg and his parents were Jewish. On the streets of New York is where he met Siegel and 1930s Murder, Inc. leader Louis Buchalter.

Alleged tie to organized crime
His first known arrest was in September 1927 for drowning Benjamin Goldstein; he was arrested with two other low-level criminals named Joseph Lefkowitz and Irving Rubinzahl. Greenberg was acquitted, and only Lefkowitz was convicted for the crime and sentenced to the electric chair, although he was later acquitted. On 11 November, 1928, police raided a home and arrested Greenberg and Siegel, Harry Teitelbaum, Louis Kravitz, Philip Kovolick, Hyman Holtz, Joseph Stacher and Jacob Shapiro. Most of these men were the assassins and backbone of Murder Inc. The men met together to discuss their rival Waxey Gordon. In 1934, dynamite was dropped through the chimney of an office owned by Siegel on Grand Street, Manhattan as retribution for Siegel murdering rival bootleggers; luckily it had exploded too early before Siegel walked into the room although he and others were wounded. Three days later, Louis and Andy Fabrizzo, who were members of Gordon's crew, were murdered and found near a distillery owned by Gordon. Shapiro, Stacher, Greenberg himself and Siegel were involved but it is alleged that only Siegel pulled the trigger. In 1936, he was ordered by Louis "Lepke" Buchalter to lead a raid into the office of Needle Trades Workers Industrial Union, who were having a meeting at the time.

Murder
On November 22, 1939, Greenberg was murdered by Bugsy Siegel, Whitey Krakow, and Lucchese crime family soldier Frankie Carbo. Prosecutors claimed that Siegel had brought them to his house and drove the getaway car, and that Carbo shot Greenberg in the head five times. His wife Ida Greenberg found him murdered at his driveway. Greenberg allegedly ordered $5,000 from Buchalter to keep his silence from law enforcement, however Buchalter subsequently ordered his murder. Siegel was sent to trial in 1940 but not convicted. The second trial began in 1942 and Carbo was the main defendant. Krakow was murdered in 1941. Abe Reles, a notorious hitman for Murder Inc., agreed to testify but the case was dismissed when he died in 1941 in an apparent suicide that appeared staged. Reles' actual cause of death is highly debated. Another Murder Inc. hitman who also became an informant, Albert Tannenbaum, said he brought the murder weapons to Los Angeles from New York and gave them to Carbo and Siegel.

Media
Greenberg was portrayed by Academy Award nominee Elliott Gould in the 1991 film Bugsy.

References

Further reading
Block, Alan A. East Side-West Side: Organizing Crime in New York, 1930-1950. New Brunswick, New Jersey: Transaction Publishers, 1983. 
Cohen, Rich. Tough Jews: Fathers, Sons, and Gangster Dreams. New York: Simon & Schuster, 1998. 
Turkus, Burton B. and Sid Feder. Murder, Inc: The Story of "the Syndicate". New York: Da Capo Press, 2003. 
Wallace, David. Hollywoodland. New York: St. Martin's Press, 2002. 

1939 deaths
1939 murders in the United States
Murdered Jewish American gangsters
People murdered by Murder, Inc.
People murdered in California
Year of birth missing
People murdered by Italian-American organized crime